Philip Keung Ho-man (born 26 October 1966) is a Hong Kong actor and film producer. Keung began his acting career as a television actor in 1985 for Asia Television (ATV), and also began appearing in films from 1988. He eventually left ATV in 2010 and became a full-time film actor while occasionally acting in television series from time to time. In 2017, Keung was nominated for the Hong Kong Film Award for Best Supporting Actor for his performance in the 2016 film, Trivisa, and in the following year, Keung won the award for his performance in the 2017 film, Shock Wave.

Early life
Keung is the oldest son in his family, being the elder brother of two younger sisters and a younger brother.  His father was already separated from his mother before he was born and thus, he has never met his father. Keung's mother was later remarried to a Chung (鍾) surnamed decorator contractor. Because his mother suffered from illness and his adopted father was busy with work at the same time, his younger siblings were sent to a children's home. When Keung was 14 years old, his mother died from her illness and he was sent to the Holland Hostel operated by the Hong Kong Student Aid Society in Kwun Tong. Keung had previously attended many primary schools, ranging from North Point to Kwun Tong. Later, he was enrolled in the Delia Memorial School (Yuet Wah).

Career
While attending secondary school, Keung starting working in a number of odd jobs such as a dim sum waiter at the China Restaurant, a decorator and an acrobat performer. He later became an extra actor since his girlfriend at that time worked in an extra actors' agency. In 1986, Keung signed up for Asia Television's (ATV) first Mr. Television Competition (電視先生選舉), where he won second place as well as the title of "Mr. Talent" (才華先生) and subsequently became a contracted artiste for ATV.

Keung received praises for his satirical portrayal of LegCo member Leung Kwok-hung in ATV's political parody program, Hong Kong Gossip. However, since the audience viewership for ATV has been low, most local audiences only began noticing him after he left ATV in 2010 and began appearing in high-profile films such as Beast Stalker (2008), The Stool Pigeon (2010) and Life Without Principle (2011), for which he was nominated for the Chinese Film Media Awards for Best Supporting Actor.

In recent years, Keung has become one of Hong Kong's most prolific film actors, appearing in over 40 films between 2013 and 2018, playing major supporting roles in many high-profile films such as Firestorm, Unbeatable, Little Big Master, Two Thumbs Up and Trivisa, for which he was nominated for the Hong Kong Film Award for Best Supporting Actor and Hong Kong Film Critics Society Award for Best Actor.

In 2017, Keung won the Best Supporting Actor Award at the 1st Profima International Film Fest & Awards in Malaysia for his performance in the action film Shock Wave, which was his first acting award in his career. At the 37th Hong Kong Film Awards, Keung was once again awarded Best Supporting Actor for his role in Shock Wave, while being nominated in the same category for his performance in the film, Concerto of the Bully.

Keung landed the leading role in two films, Tracey and Remember What I Forgot, which were promoted at the 2018 Hong Kong International Film & TV Market (FILMART), which ran from 19 to 22 March 2018. In the former, Keung played a 51-year-old married man and father whose craving for feminization increases, while he played a Hong Kong film fanatic who suffers from brain degeneration in the latter.

In 2019, Keung starred in the TVB drama The Defected as “Bingo”, for which he was placed in top five nominations for Best Actor at the 2019 TVB Anniversary Awards. In 2021, he starred in the TVB drama Murder Diary as the Superintendent of Police “Nip Shan”, who suffered from Bipolar Disorder after his wife's disappearance. Being invited by Hana Kuk, Keung filmed his first MV for “Trust Nobody”, the ending theme of Murder Diary.

Personal life
In 1999, Keung married former ATV actress, Anna Kam (殷寧).

His wife is known as Kappy King.  She competed in the Miss ATV Pageant and was voted as Miss Congeniality.

Filmography

Films

Television dramas

Music Videos

References

External links
Philip Keung on Facebook

1966 births
Living people
Hong Kong male film actors
20th-century Hong Kong male actors
21st-century Hong Kong male actors
Hong Kong male television actors
Hong Kong film producers
People from Bao'an County